779 Nina (prov. designation:  or ) is a large background asteroid, approximately  in diameter, located in the central region of the asteroid belt. It was discovered on 25 January 1914, by Russian astronomer Grigory Neujmin(1886-1946) at the Simeiz Observatory on the Crimean peninsula. The metallic X-type asteroid with an intermediate albedo has a rotation period of 11.2 hours. It was named after the discoverer's sister, Nina Neujmina (Tsentilovich) (1889–1971).

Orbit and classification 

Nina is a non-family asteroid of the main belt's background population when applying the hierarchical clustering method to its proper orbital elements. It orbits the Sun in the central main-belt at a distance of 2.1–3.3 AU once every 4 years and 4 months (1,588 days; semi-major axis of 2.66 AU). Its orbit has an eccentricity of 0.23 and an inclination of 15° with respect to the ecliptic. The observation arc begins at Vienna Observatory on 31 July 1916, more than two years after to its official discovery observation at Simeiz Observatory on Crimea.

Naming 

This minor planet was  after Nina Nikolaevna Neujmina (Tsentilovich) (1889–1971), mathematician and sister of Russian discoverer Grigory Neujmin(1886-1946).

Physical characteristics 

In the Bus–Binzel SMASS classification, Nina is an X-type asteroid. It is also an X-type in both the Tholen- and SMASS-like taxonomy of the Small Solar System Objects Spectroscopic Survey (S3OS2). Belskaya classifies Nina as a metallic M-type asteroid, which is the equivalent spectral type in the Tholen taxonomy for X-types with an intermediate albedo (see below).

Rotation period 

In June 1981, a rotational lightcurve of Nina was obtained from photometric observations by Alan Harris at the Table Mountain and Lowell observatories. Lightcurve analysis gave a rotation period of  hours with a brightness variation of  magnitude. It was confirmed by Brian Warner at his Palmer Divide Observatory  in Colorado in January 2009, who determined a period of  hours with an amplitude of  magnitude. In September 2012, French amateur astronomer Gérald Rousseau obtained a period of  hours with an amplitude of  magnitude.

Diameter and albedo 

The Collaborative Asteroid Lightcurve Link adopts Petr Pravec's revised WISE-albedo of 0.1694 and takes a diameter of 77.46 kilometers based on an absolute magnitude of 8.1. These timed observations are taken when the asteroid passes in front of a distant star.

Notes

References

External links 
 Lightcurve Database Query (LCDB), at www.minorplanet.info
 Dictionary of Minor Planet Names, Google books
 Asteroids and comets rotation curves, CdR – Geneva Observatory, Raoul Behrend
 Discovery Circumstances: Numbered Minor Planets (1)-(5000) – Minor Planet Center
 
 

000779
Discoveries by Grigory Neujmin
Named minor planets
000779
19140125